Holy History of Mankind (Die heilige Geschichte der Menschheit) is a book by the philosopher Moses Hess. Although the work was completely disregarded  at the time it was published, the work is significant not only as Hess’s first large-scale expression of socialism, but also as the first expression of socialism written in Germany. This was among Hess’s earliest works, published in 1837, and in it he foresees a future socialistic Europe, drawing its inspiration from the initial Jewish commonwealth in which politics was subservient to ethical precepts.

Hess claims that the original harmony that the Jews had with God was lost, but that now the Jews had the opportunity to reestablish this harmony through socialism. Hess divides the work in two sections of time; the past and the future. Hess defines the past as “the foundation of that which is to come”, and the future as “a consequence of that which has happened.” 

The past is divided into three parts, in which the time before Christ is regarded as the Jews’ unconscious union with God, where a harmony founded on a community of possessions reigned. Christ disjoints the harmony, but the disjuncture does not reach its climax until the Middle Ages, which laid the inevitable foundations for the appearance of private property in modern society. 

Influenced heavily by Spinoza, Hess points out that the French Revolution lays the way for the retrieval of the original social unity, initially expressed through the old Jewish commonwealth, now to be recreated through the disappearance of private property and the re-established unity of spirit and matter enunciated by Spinoza. 

Hess describes the future as a society in which the ideals of freedom and equality are realized through communism. Hess expresses the hope that the change would come about through peaceful means, but feared otherwise because of the ever-widening gap between the rich and the poor.

References
Hess, Moses. "The Holy History of Mankind and Other Writings", ed. by Shlomo Avineri. Cambridge University Press, 2005.

McLellan, David. ‘’’The Young Hegelians and Karl Marx’’’. Frederick A. Praeger Publishers. Page 138.

Communist books
Philosophy books
Works about Baruch Spinoza
1837 non-fiction books